The Baldwin Piano Company is an American piano brand. It was once the largest US-based manufacturer of keyboard instruments and known by the slogan, "America's Favorite Piano". Since 2001, it has been a subsidiary of Gibson Brands, Inc. It ceased most domestic production in December 2008, moving its total production to China.

History

The company traces its origins back to 1857, when Dwight Hamilton Baldwin began teaching piano, organ, and violin in Cincinnati, Ohio. In 1862, Baldwin started a Decker Brothers piano dealership and, in 1866, hired Lucien Wulsin as a clerk. Wulsin became a partner in the dealership, by then known as D.H. Baldwin & Company, in 1873, and, under his leadership, the Baldwin Company became the largest piano dealer in the Midwestern United States by the 1890s.

In 1889–1890, Baldwin vowed to build "the best piano that could be built" and subsequently formed two production companies: Hamilton Organ, which built reed organs, and the Baldwin Piano Company, which made pianos. The company's first piano, an upright, began selling in 1891. The company introduced its first grand piano in 1895.

Baldwin died in 1899 and left the vast majority of his estate to fund missionary causes. Wulsin ultimately purchased Baldwin's estate and continued the company's shift from retail to manufacturing. The company won its first major award in 1900, when their model 112 won the Grand Prix at the Exposition Universelle in Paris, the first American manufactured piano to win such an award. Baldwin-manufactured pianos also won top awards at the Louisiana Purchase Exposition and the 1914 Anglo-American Exposition. By 1913, business had become brisk, with Baldwin exporting to thirty-two countries in addition to having retailers throughout the United States.

Baldwin, like many other manufacturers, began building player pianos in the 1920s. A piano factory was constructed in Cincinnati, Ohio. The models became unpopular by the end of the 1920s, which, coupled with the beginning of the Great Depression, could have spelled disaster for Baldwin. However, the company's president, Lucien Wulsin II, had created a large reserve fund for such situations, and Baldwin was able to ride out the market downturn.

During World War II, the US War Production Board ordered the cessation of all US piano manufacturing so that the factories could be used for the US war effort. Baldwin factories were used to manufacture plywood airplane components for various aircraft such as the Aeronca PT-23 trainer and the stillborn Curtiss-Wright C-76 Caravan cargo aircraft. While the employment of wood components in military aircraft could by no means be considered a resounding success, lessons learned in constructing plywood aircraft wings ultimately assisted in Baldwin's development of its 21-ply maple pinblock design used in its postwar piano models.

After the war ended, Baldwin resumed selling pianos, and by 1953 the company had doubled production figures from prewar levels. In 1946, Baldwin introduced its first electronic organ (developed in 1941), which became so successful that the company changed its name to the Baldwin Piano & Organ Company. In 1961, Lucien Wulsin III became president. By 1963, the company had acquired C. Bechstein Pianofortefabrik and remained its owner until 1986. In 1959, Baldwin constructed a new piano manufacturing plant in Conway, Arkansas, originally to manufacture upright pianos: by 1973, the company had built 1,000,000 upright pianos. In 1961 Baldwin constructed a new piano factory in Greenwood, Mississippi. Subsequently production of upright pianos was moved from Cincinnati, Ohio to Greenwood.

The company next attempted to capitalize on the growth of pop music. After an unsuccessful bid to buy Fender Musical Instruments Corporation, Baldwin bought Burns of London in 1965 for $380,000, and began selling the guitars through the company's piano retail outlets. During this time period, Baldwin engineer Robert C. Scherer developed the Prismatone pickup for nylon string guitars. Unaccustomed to marketing guitars, the Baldwin stores failed to interest many guitar buyers, and sales proved disappointing. In 1967, Baldwin also bought Gretsch guitars, which had its own experienced guitar sales force and a distribution network of authorized retail outlets. However, Fender and Gibson continued to dominate, and sales did not reach expected levels. The Gretsch guitar operation was sold back to the Gretsch family in 1989.

Throughout the 1970s, the company undertook a significant bid to diversify into financial services. Under the leadership of Morley P. Thompson, Baldwin bought dozens of firms and by the early 1980s owned over 200 savings and loan institutions, insurance companies and investment firms, including MGIC Investment Corporation. The company changed its name to Baldwin-United in 1977 after a merger with United Corp.  In 1980, the company opened a new piano manufacturing facility in Trumann, Arkansas. By 1982, however, the piano business contributed only three percent of Baldwin's $3.6 billion revenues. Meanwhile, the company had taken on significant debt to finance its acquisitions and new facilities, and was finding it increasingly difficult to meet its loan obligations. In 1983, the holding company and several of its subsidiaries were forced into bankruptcy with a total debt of over $9 billion—at that time, the largest bankruptcy ever.  However, the piano business was not part of the bankruptcy.

During bankruptcy proceedings in 1984, the Baldwin piano business was sold to its management. The new company went public in 1986 as the Baldwin Piano and Organ Company and moved its headquarters to Loveland, Ohio.

However, difficulties continued as demographic changes and foreign competition slowed sales of keyboard instruments. The company responded by acquiring Wurlitzer to increase market share and by moving manufacturing overseas to reduce production costs. In 1998, the company moved its headquarters from Loveland to nearby Deerfield Township. Throughout the 1990s, the company's fortunes improved, and by 1998, the company's 270 employees at its Conway, Arkansas facility were building 2,200 grand pianos a year. However, in 2001, Baldwin was again facing difficulties, and filed for bankruptcy once again, when the company was bought by Gibson Guitar Corporation. In 2005, the company laid off some workers from its Trumann, Arkansas manufacturing plant while undergoing restructuring.

As a subsidiary of Gibson Guitar Corporation, the company has manufactured instruments under the Baldwin, Chickering, Wurlitzer, Hamilton, and Howard names. Baldwin bought two piano factories in China in which they manufacture grand and vertical pianos. Models built in the factory in Zhongshan, China include the Baldwin Hamilton studio models B243 and B247, which are the most popular school pianos ever built. The much larger factory in Dongbei is not building pianos at this time. Baldwin grand pianos are being built to Baldwin specification by Parsons Music, China. All new pianos are being sold under the Baldwin name and not Wurlitzer, Hamilton or Chickering.

Baldwin stopped manufacturing new pianos at its Trumann, Arkansas, factory in December 2008. They retained a small staff to build custom grands and to finish numerous artist grands, however the factory in Trumann, AR was later closed and remaining inventory disposed of. Since 2008, Baldwin has not produced pianos in the United States.

Models

Grand pianos 
Current Grand Piano Models:

 BP 148: 4'10" (148 cm)
 BP 152: 5'0" (152 cm)
 BP 165: 5'5" (165 cm)
 BP 178: 5'10" (178 cm)
 BP 190: 6'3" (190 cm)
 BP 211: 6'11" (211 cm)

Upright pianos 
Current Upright Piano Models:

 B342/B42 Acrosonic: 43 ½" (110 cm)
 B442/B42 Acrosonic: 43 ½" (110 cm)
 B243/B47 Hamilton: 47" (119 cm)
 B252 Concert Vertical: 52" (132 cm)
 BP1
 BPE1
 BP3
 BP3T
 BP5
 BP-X5

Notable performers

Many distinguished musicians have chosen to compose, perform and record using Baldwin pianos, including the pianists Walter Gieseking, Claudio Arrau, Mike Shinoda, Jorge Bolet, Morton Estrin, Margaret Baxtresser (née Barthel), Earl Wild and José Iturbi and the composers Aaron Copland, Philip Glass, Igor Stravinsky, Béla Bartók, Stephen Sondheim, Leonard Bernstein, Lukas Foss, André Previn, and John Williams. Baldwin pianos have been used by popular entertainers including Ray Charles, Liberace, Richard Carpenter, Michael Feinstein, Ben Folds, Billy Joel, Cat Stevens, and Carly Simon, and jazz pianists Dave Brubeck, George Shearing and Dick Hyman. Amy Lee, the lead vocalist, pianist and keyboardist of Evanescence also uses this brand in most of her compositions, recordings and live performances. A Baldwin piano was seen nightly being played by Paul Shaffer on the Late Show with David Letterman. Baldwin was the official piano of the television show Glee. Marian McPartland's long-running radio show Piano Jazz was hosted by Baldwin. Baldwin was second only to Steinway in its artist and symphony roster.

Bibliography
 Crombie, David. Piano: Evolution, Design, and Performance. Barnes and Noble, 2000. First printed by Balafon Books, Great Britain, 1995.
 Baldwin Piano & Organ Company Encyclopedia of Company Histories. Answers.com. Accessed March 1, 2007.

References

External links

 Official website
 Morley Thompson Interview NAMM Oral History Library (2003)
 Lucien Wulsin Interview NAMM Oral History Library (2005)

Piano manufacturing companies of the United States
American brands
Companies based in Loveland, Ohio
Gibson Brands
Music instrument endorsement lists
Music of Cincinnati
Manufacturing companies based in Ohio
American companies established in 1857
Manufacturing companies established in 1857
1857 establishments in Ohio
2001 mergers and acquisitions
Companies that filed for Chapter 11 bankruptcy in 2018